Mike Uremovich (born August 21, 1976) is an American football coach. He is the head football coach at Butler University, a position he has held since the 2022 season. Prior to Butler, Uremovich was the offensive coordinator at Temple and Northern Illinois under Rod Carey. He was also the head coach at the University of St. Francis in Joliet, Illinois from 2005 to 2011.

Head coaching record

References

External links
 
 Butler profile

1976 births
Living people
Benedictine Eagles football coaches
Butler Bulldogs football coaches
NC State Wolfpack football coaches
Northern Illinois Huskies football coaches
St. Francis Fighting Saints football coaches
Temple Owls football coaches
Waynesburg Yellow Jackets football coaches
Northern Illinois University alumni
Purdue University alumni
High school football coaches in Illinois
High school football coaches in Indiana
People from Chelsea, Michigan
Coaches of American football from Michigan